The Meyers Fire burned in Beaverhead-Deerlodge National Forest and Bitterroot National Forest in the U.S. state of Montana and was first reported on July 17, 2017 at 5:21pm. As of September 28, 2017, it encompassed . The Meyers Fire originated after a lightning storm passed over the region, starting a fire in remote terrain in Granite County, Montana within Beaverhead-Deerlodge National Forest. The fire then burned into neighboring Ravalli County, Montana and then crossed the continental divide into Beaverhead County, Montana and Deer Lodge County, Montana, where it entered Bitterroot National Forest. By August 3, the Meyers and Whetstone Fires merged, with the name of the former being the official name of the event. Due to a heavy fuel load, exceptionally dry conditions with high heat and periods of strong winds, the Meyers Fire had periods of explosive growth during August and early September, leading to evacuations of nearby communities.

References 

2017 in Montana
2017 Montana wildfires